Sycamore Junior High School may refer to:

 Sycamore Junior High School (Montgomery, Ohio), in the Sycamore Community School District
 Sycamore Junior High School (Orange County, California), in the Anaheim Union High School District